The Franconian is the  middle stage of the Upper or Late Cambrian in North America, equivalent to the Chinese Changshanian with a span of nearly 4.5 million years, from about 497 to 492.5 Ma. The name comes from the Franconia Formation,  about 100 feet (30 m) of sandstone and green shale exposed near the town of Franconia in eastern Minnesota, north of St Paul.

The Franconian is preceded by the Dresbachian and followed by the Trempealeauan, respectively the lower and upper stages of the North American Upper Cambrian or Croixan Series.

References
 Chen Jun-yuan & Teichert C, 1983; Cambrian Cephalopods, Geology Vol 11, pp647–650, Nov 1983
 Flower R.H.1964,  The Nautiloid Order Ellesmerocerida (Cephalopoda) Menoir 12, New Mexico Bureau of Mines and Mineral Resources, Socorro, NM
Harland, W. B. et al1 990. A Geologic Time Scale 1989. Cambridge University Press, Cambridge . Ref in Paleobiology Database on line. 
 Moore, Lalicker, and Fischer 1952; Invertebrate Fossils; McGraw-
 Geowhen database. 

Cambrian geochronology
Cambrian Minnesota
Jiangshanian
Paibian